Walter Brandt (24 March 1917 – 18 January 1977) was a German Luftwaffe ace and recipient of the Knight's Cross of the Iron Cross during World War II.  The Knight's Cross of the Iron Cross was awarded to recognise extreme battlefield bravery or successful military leadership.  Walter Brandt was credited with 43 aerial victories in 527 missions.

Awards
 Ehrenpokal der Luftwaffe (5 September 1942)
 Front Flying Clasp of the Luftwaffe in Gold
 Iron Cross (1939)
 2nd Class
 1st Class
 Wound Badge (1939)
 in Silver
 German Cross in Gold on 12 December 1942 as Feldwebel in the 2./Jagdgeschwader 77
 Knight's Cross of the Iron Cross on 24 March 1943 as Oberfeldwebel and pilot in the I./Jagdgeschwader 77

Notes

References

Citations

Bibliography

External links
TracesOfWar.com
Ritterkreuztraeger 1939-1945
Aces of the Luftwaffe

1917 births
1977 deaths
Luftwaffe pilots
German World War II flying aces
Recipients of the Gold German Cross
Recipients of the Knight's Cross of the Iron Cross
People from Bad Salzuflen
Military personnel from North Rhine-Westphalia